The Young SVP is the youth wing of the Swiss People's Party (SVP/UDC).

Founded in 1977 as a part of the SVP's Zurich branch, the Young SVP served as a training ground for many of the SVP's future leaders.

Footnotes

References
 

Swiss People's Party
Youth wings of political parties in Switzerland
Political parties established in 1977
International Young Democrat Union